The Sneffels Range, regionally conterminous with San Juans, is a young, prominent, and rugged range of mountains in southwestern Colorado of the San Juan Mountains. The Sneffels range form the southern border of Ouray County and run west to east.

Prominence
The Sneffels Range can be viewed from as far as the La Sal Mountains in eastern Utah and is very prominent from most vantage points of the Uncompahgre Valley. The most prominent peak of the Sneffels Range is Mount Sneffels reaching .

Mount Sneffels 14,158 ft
Teakettle Mountain 13,819 ft
Dallas Peak 13,809 ft
Potosi Peak 13,786 ft
Gilpin Peak 13,694 ft
Cirque Mountain 13,686 ft
Mount Emma 13,581 ft
Mears Peak 13,496 ft
Whitehouse Mountain 13,492 ft
Mount Ridgway 13,468 ft
Chicago Peak 13,385 ft
Campbell Peak 13,213 ft
United States Mountain 13,036 ft
Hayden Peak 12,987 ft
Stony Mountain 12,698 ft

See also

Cimarron Ridge

References

External links

San Juan Mountains (Colorado)
Mountain ranges of Ouray County, Colorado